Vincent Muda (born 14 August 1988 in Amsterdam) is a Dutch rower. He competed in the lightweight coxless four at the 2012 Summer Olympics.  Muda started rowing at Weesp rowing club together with his twin brother Tycho.

References

 

1988 births
Living people
Dutch male rowers
Rowers from Amsterdam
Rowers at the 2012 Summer Olympics
Olympic rowers of the Netherlands
Dutch twins